April Masini is an American advice columnist also known for her political advocacy for the television and film industry in Hawaii.

Career

April Masini is an advice columnist and commentator who offers dating and relationship advice to people of different ages, ethnicities, and sexual orientations, often supporting traditional gender roles and arguing that the feminist movement has damaged relationships in America. Her advice for women on relationships, marriage, and sex has appeared in O, Glamour, Ebony, Cosmopolitan, Woman's Day, SheKnows.com, and Brides. Her writing on a range of topics has also appeared in YourTango, Bustle, Women's Health, Men's Health, Medical Daily, and as a sex advice columnist at AskMen.     In addition, more than 27,000 questions have been asked and answered on her Ask April advice forum.

Masini also provides commentary on a range of issues involving relationships and money. Masini has appeared as a featured guest on The Wall Street Journals podcast "Do Men Still Have to Pay on the First Date?" and The O'Reilly Factor, as well as host of Everything You Need to Know About Sex. Masini is regularly interviewed and consulted on financial issues in dating and marriage and on workplace issues by MainStreet, GoBankingRates and TheStreet.

Masini has also commented widely on the Millennial generation and its preference for cyberspace and casual outings, rather than old-fashioned venues and dinner dates. She observes that "Millennials who think money is the measure of power in relationships aren’t wrong, but they’re short sighted. It’s just one." Masini cautions that the 69% of Millennials who see pet ownership as preparation for parenting may be mistaken. And when asked by NBC News to comment on a Tinder-style app that matches local surrogate or prospective co-parents, she advised Millennials: "If you think sex is intimate and causes fireworks when a hot relationship ends, take a stroll through family court and watch custody battles unravel."

Other issues

Although the focus of Masini's forum is dating and relationships, she has been called on by the media for her opinion on a range of issues, including real estate transactions (BBC News), the relationships of sports teams with their fans (The New York Times), and television and movies (USA Today), the selling of beer and wine by Starbucks (The Christian Science Monitor), along with every imaginable dating and relationship question or opinion. 

Politics

Masini has conservative political views and has been consulted on a range of political issues. Regarding Donald Trump, she stated in April 2016: "I do not believe there is a single career politician who can begin to compete with Trump when it comes to the economy or resolving the debt crisis." When asked about Trump's attitudes toward women, she commented that he is "a fighter … If a woman attacks him, he fights back against her the same way he fights back against a man, because to him she is just as strong and just as capable as any man." Masini argues that this quality in Trump "makes [him] the ultimate feminist — he treats men and women equally."

When asked how conservatives should respond to the 2012 Supreme Court decision upholding President Obama's health care legislation, where Chief Justice John Roberts sided with the majority, Masini advised: "If you're considering a Democratic ticket in the November election as a way to show Roberts that nobody messes with you and walks away unscathed, reconsider," she said. "It backfires, and while you may feel good about being an ass — I mean, donkey — you'll ultimately be betraying yourself." She advocates dating within one's own political party: "You can cross party lines, but don't you think you'll be happier with someone who sees things the way you do when it comes to issues like the death penalty, gun control and abortion?"

Political advocate – entertainment industry executive and producer

Prior to her career as an advice columnist, April Masini worked—first with her former husband, Al Masini, and then independently—on a number of projects that led to the expansion of the television and film industry in Hawaii. The Masinis produced and organized the 1998 Miss Universe Pageant, successfully lobbying the Hawaii legislature for $3.3 million to fund the event, which brought delegations from 85 countries to Hawaii, each with its own news media. Al Masini was the pageant's producer for Hawaii, while April Masini served as co-chair and event coordinator, both working for nearly a year without pay. In 1998, Hawaii Governor Ben Cayetano acknowledged the couple's contribution to the state by proclaiming June 4th of that year "Al and April Masini Day."

In 1999, April Masini persuaded Greg Bonann, executive producer of Baywatch, to move the television show to Hawaii for three years, instead of the proposed move to Australia. Masini reached out to the governor and legislators of Hawaii, who then advocated for the move; and she was "relentless in her pursuit" of the Baywatch producers, who "eventually gave in and added ‘Hawaii’ to the show's name." Coming at a time of economic downturn, the move paved the way in 2001 for Hawaii's Act 221, designed to develop the state's high-technology industry through the use of tax incentives.

In 1999, production costs in Hawaii were significantly higher than in Australia, with its favorable tax codes. To lure Baywatch, Hawaii offered the show's producers an incentives package that included $2 million in soundstage and shoreside facilities improvements. To make the Hawaii production affordable, the International Alliance of Theatrical Stage Employees agreed to 12–15 percent wage cuts, while Governor Ben Cayetano cut a deal with the Teamsters Local 399 in Los Angeles to improve wages and working conditions for the drivers.

According to Bonann, Baywatch Hawaii was "one of the reasons" prompting Hawaii to adopt Act 221. The show brought more than $30 million to the state's economy, with local actors appearing in lead roles, local musical talent contributing to every episode, and local professionals making up 80 percent of the crew.

In 1999, April Masini helped the highly rated cable show, Pacific Blue, film a two-part episode in Hawaii by contacting executive producer Bill Nuss, "who was vacationing in Kona, and talking him into bringing the show here at least for a couple of episodes," according to Nuss. Filmed primarily in and around Waikiki, the episodes were Pacific Blue'''s first-ever filming outside California. In bringing the show to Hawaii, Nuss hoped to prove that a cable or network series could afford to film in the state.

Also in 1999, April Masini was a producer on Destination Stardom.

In 2002, April Masini was the first to use Hawaii's newly passed Act 221, designed to develop the state's technology industry. In August 2002, right after the bill was signed, she brought the tax incentives to the attention of Universal Studios for the financing of Surf Girls, according to Joe Blanco, technology advisor to Hawaii Governor Ben Cayetano. Through Act 221, she then raised approximately $16 million in financing for the film, which was renamed Blue Crush. Based on a magazine article entitled "Surf Girls of Maui," by Susan Orlean, Blue Crush was praised by Slates Greg Milner as "a sharp depiction—both in its details and its symbolism—of life in Hawaii" and as a film that "makes surfing feel like real life,"

Los Angeles-based entertainment attorney John LaViolette of Bloom Hergott Deimer and Cook, which represents Hollywood A-list actors like Arnold Schwarzenegger and Sylvester, commented: "This is the first time that I have heard of a studio making a commitment to foster a mutually beneficial cross promotion between the film and the location where it's been shot." LaViolette worked in conjunction with producers April Masini and Adam Fields, who advised the State of Hawaii during the negotiation. The resulting agreement formed a relationship between Universal Studios and the Hawaii Visitors and Convention Bureau, by which Universal Studios agreed to promote the state along with the movie in exchange for funding.Blue Crush was eligible for Act 221 funding because the state law included performing arts within its definition of qualified high-tech businesses. As the top 2001 top beneficiary of the tax credit program, the film came under fire from critics such as David Watumull, president and CEO of Hawaii Biotech. Watumull argued that the law had not "contemplated the dollar amounts that are going into movies, which are then taking those dollars away from high-tech and biotech companies," adding, "I'm also not sure that the law contemplated the short-term nature of movie projects."

However, Masini's efforts to bring film and television to Hawaii, along with the marketing, promotional, and tourism dollars they offer, continued to pay off years after the productions had left. In 2004, for example, Blue Crush was featured in a U.S. Department of Commerce marketing campaign to lure British travelers to America. Hawaii's contribution to the campaign, seen on the walls of the London underground and on street billboards, was an image from Blue Crush of a surfer catching a wave.

In October 2002, April Masini brought a malpractice and fraud complaint against Cades Schutte, one of Hawaii's oldest and largest law firms, and Cades Schutte partner Vito Galati, claiming the firm had conspired to limit her profits in the Blue Crush'' deal.

Personal
April Masini was born in Fort Bragg, North Carolina, to Robert "Bob" Barry, director of Vietnam Veterans of America, and author and educator June Stride. She grew up in Clarkesville, Georgia.

April Masini moved to New York City in 1983 to study business at Hofstra University but soon withdrew from college to pursue a career in television acting and modeling. She studied at The Actors Studio and performed Off-Broadway and in television pilots, commercials, and soap operas. In the early 1990s, she met Al Masini, to whom she was married from 1995 to 2000. The Masinis relocated to Hawaii in 1995, and April Masini remained there until 2001. She currently lives in New York City. Although regarded as politically conservative, she supported the 1994 and 1998 campaigns of Hawaii Governor Ben Cayetano, a Democrat, and she is socially liberal in some respects.

Books
Out Of Your League'', Dating Tips, Dating Advice, 2003, 
Think & Date Like A Man, Dating Tips, Dating Advice, 2005,

References

External links
AprilMasini.com
AIFI.org

Living people
1964 births
American stage actresses
American advice columnists
American women columnists
People from Fort Bragg, North Carolina
American entertainment industry businesspeople
American television actresses
Actresses from North Carolina
Writers from North Carolina
20th-century American actresses
21st-century American non-fiction writers
Writers from Hawaii
People from Clarkesville, Georgia
21st-century American women writers
American women non-fiction writers